Strangers on a Train is a play written by Craig Warner and is based on the 1950 novel of the same name by Patricia Highsmith. The show made its  West End and world premiere at the Gielgud Theatre on 19 November 2013, following previews from 2 November.

Production history
Strangers on a Train is a thriller written by Craig Warner, based on the 1950 novel Strangers on a Train written by Patricia Highsmith. Officially confirmed on 20 September 2013, the play began previews on 2 November 2013, before making its world premiere at the Gielgud Theatre on 19 November, booking until 22 February 2014. The production is directed by Robert Allan Ackerman, produced by Barbara Broccoli, with design by Tim Goodchild, lighting by Tim Lutkin, sound by Avgoustas Psillas, projection design by Peter Wilms and costumes by Dona Granata. Casting for the production included Laurence Fox as Guy, Jack Huston as Bruno, Christian McKay as Gerard, Miranda Raison as Anne, Imogen Stubbs as Elsie and MyAnna Buring as Miriam. A typical West End performance runs for two and a half hours, including one interval.

Roles and original cast

Critical reception
The West End production of Strangers on a Train received positive reviews from critics.

References

External links
 
 

2013 plays
West End plays
English plays
Plays based on novels